
This is a list of the 26 players who earned their 2008 PGA Tour card through Q School in 2007.

Players in yellow are 2008 PGA Tour rookies.

2008 Results

*PGA Tour rookie in 2008
T = Tied 
Green background indicates the player retained his PGA Tour card for 2009 (finished inside the top 125). 
Yellow background indicates the player did not retain his PGA Tour card for 2009, but retained conditional status (finished between 126-150). 
Red background indicates the player did not retain his PGA Tour card for 2009 (finished outside the top 150).

Winners on the PGA Tour in 2008

Runners-up on the PGA Tour in 2008

See also
2007 Nationwide Tour graduates

References
All information from here.

PGA Tour Qualifying School
PGA Tour Qualifying School Graduates
PGA Tour Qualifying School Graduates